Sugar Creek is a tributary of Middle Island Creek,  long, in northwestern West Virginia in the United States.

McKim Creek rises northeast of Wick in southwestern Tyler County and flows generally westward into eastern Pleasants County, through the unincorporated communities of Wick and Meadville in Tyler County and Twiggs in Pleasants County.

According to the Geographic Names Information System, Sugar Creek has also been known historically by the name "Owlshead Run."

See also
List of rivers of West Virginia

References 

Rivers of West Virginia
Rivers of Tyler County, West Virginia
Rivers of Pleasants County, West Virginia